Nocera can refer to:

Places
Nocera Inferiore, a comune in Campania, Italy
Nocera Superiore, a comune in Campania, Italy
Nocera Terinese, a comune in Calabria, Italy
Nocera Umbra, a comune in Umbria, Italy
 Nocera dei Pagani
Diocese of Nocera, a Roman Catholic diocese in Italy
Diocese of Nocera Inferiore-Sarno, a Roman Catholic diocese in Italy

People
Daniel G. Nocera, inorganic chemist
Gwladys Nocera, French golfer
Joe Nocera, American journalist
Nocera (singer) (Maria Nocera), American singer and DJ

Other 
Battle of Nocera
Nocera (grape), a Sicilian red grape variety